Zhu Wenxin (born February 11, 1980) was the left wing position in the 2008 Beijing Olympic Games handball sport. He did not win a medal, nor did the team get through into the finals.

References

Olympic handball players of China
Chinese male handball players
Handball players at the 2008 Summer Olympics
Living people
1980 births
Sportspeople from Heilongjiang
Handball players at the 2002 Asian Games
Asian Games competitors for China
21st-century Chinese people